George Mraz (born Jiří Mráz; 9 September 1944 – 16 September 2021) was a Czech-born American jazz bassist and alto saxophonist. He was a member of Oscar Peterson's group, and worked with Pepper Adams, Stan Getz, Michel Petrucciani, Stephane Grappelli, Tommy Flanagan, Jimmy Raney, Chet Baker, Joe Henderson, John Abercrombie, John Scofield, and Richie Beirach, among others.

During the 1970s, he was a member of the New York Jazz Quartet and The Thad Jones/Mel Lewis Orchestra, and in the 1980s a member of Quest. He also appeared with Joe Lovano, Hank Jones and Paul Motian on Lovano's records I'm All For You and Joyous Encounter.

Discography

As leader/co-leader
 1977: Alone Together with Masaru Imada (Three Blind Mice)
 1992: Catching Up
 1995: Jazz with Richie Beirach, Billy Hart, Larry Willis, Rich Perry
 1995: My Foolish Heart with Richie Beirach, Billy Hart
 1997: Bottom Lines with Cyrus Chestnut, Al Foster, Rich Perry
 1999: Duke's Place with Renee Rosnes, Billy Drummond, Cyrus Chestnut
 2002: Morava with Billy Hart, Emil Viklicky, Zuzana Lapčíková
 2007: Moravian Gems with Iva Bittova, Emil Viklicky, Laco Tropp
 2012: George Mraz quartet-Jazz na Hrade with David Hazeltine, Rich Perry, Joey Baron
 2014: Together Again with Emil Viklický

With the New York Jazz Quartet
 The New York Jazz Quartet In Concert In Japan (Salvation (Japan), 1975)
 Surge (Enja, 1977)
 Song of the Black Knight (Sonet 1977)
 Blues for Sarka (Enja, 1978)
 New York Jazz Quartet in Chicago (Bee Hive, 1981)
 Oasis (Enja, 1981)
 Manhattan David Hazeltine - George Mraz Trio (Chesky Records) 2006
 Your StoryGeorge Mraz / David Hazeltine Trio (Cube - Metier) 2012

As sideman
With Pepper Adams
Ephemera (Spotlite, 1973)
Julian (Enja, 1975)
Twelfth & Pingree (Enja, 1975)
Reflectory (Muse, 1978)
The Master... (Muse, 1980)
Urban Dreams (Palo Alto, 1981)

With John Abercrombie
Arcade (ECM, 1978)
Abercrombie Quartet (ECM, 1979)
Straight Flight (JAM, 1979)
M (ECM, 1980)
Solar (1985)

With Toshiko Akiyoshi
Time Stream (1984)
Four Seasons (1990)
Remembering Bud: Cleopatra's Dream (1990)
Time Stream: Toshiko Plays Toshiko (1996)
Hope (2006)
50th Anniversary Concert in Japan (2006)

With Eric Alexander
Solid! (Milestone, 1998)

With Chet Baker
Studio Trieste (CTI, 1982) with Jim Hall and Hubert Laws
With Kenny Barron
Minor Blues (Venus, 2009)
With Richie Beirach
Elm (ECM, 1979)
With Dee Dee Bridgewater
Afro Blue (Trio, 1974)
With Bob Brookmeyer
Back Again (Sonet, 1978)
With Kenny Burrell
Ellington Is Forever Volume Two (Fantasy, 1975)
With George Cables
Senorita de Aranjuez (Meldec Jazz, 2001)
With Benny Carter
In the Mood for Swing (MusicMasters, 1988)
My Man Benny, My Man Phil (MusicMasters, 1990)
With Arnett Cobb
Arnett Cobb Is Back (Progressive, 1978)
With Larry Coryell
Comin' Home (Muse, 1984)
With Kenny Drew
Lite Flite (SteepleChase, 1977)
With Yelena Eckemoff featuring Mark Turner, Joe Locke & Billy Hart
A Touch of Radiance (L&H, 2014)
With Jon Faddis
Jon & Billy (Trio, 1974) with Billy Harper
Youngblood (Pablo, 1976)
With Art Farmer
Crawl Space (CTI, 1977)
With Tommy Flanagan
Eclypso (Enja, 1977)
Ballads & Blues (Enja, 1978)
Confirmation (Enja, 1977–78 [1982])
The Magnificent Tommy Flanagan (Progressive, 1981)
Giant Steps (Enja, 1982)
Thelonica (Enja, 1982)
Nights at the Vanguard (Uptown, 1986)
Jazz Poet (1989)
Beyond the Blue Bird (1990)

With Stan Getz
 Line for Lyons (Sonet, 1983) with Chet Baker
 The Stockholm Concert (Sonet, 1983 [1989])
 Voyage (Blackhawk 1986)
Bossas & Ballads – The Lost Sessions (Verve, 1989 [2003])

With Dizzy Gillespie
The Winter in Lisbon (Milan, 1990)
Bird Songs: The Final Recordings (Telarc, 1992)
To Bird with Love (Telarc, 1992)

With Urbie Green
The Fox (CTI, 1976)
With Jim Hall
Jim Hall & Basses (Telarc, 2001)
With Sir Roland Hanna
1 X 1 (Toho (Japan), 1974)
Porgy & Bess (Trio (Japan), 1976)
24 Preludes Book 1 (Salvation (Japan), 1976)
Time for the Dancers (Progressive, 1977)
Sir Elf Plus 1 (Choice, 1977)
Glove (Trio (Japan), 1977)
24 Preludes Book 2 (Salvation (Japan), 1977)
This Must Be Love (Progressive 1978)
Rolandscape (Progressive, 1978)
Roland Hanna and George Mraz Play for Monk (Musical Heritage Society, 1978)
Sunrise, Sunset (LOB, 1979)
Romanesque (Trio (Japan), 1982)
This Must Be Love (Audiophile, 1983)
Milano, Paris, New York: Finding John Lewis (Venus, 2002)
With Jaroslav Jakubovič
Coincidence (VMM, 2009)

With Elvin Jones
Earth Jones (Palo Alto, 1982)
Youngblood (Enja, 1992)

With Fred Lipsius
Dreaming of Your Love, (mja Records, 1995)

With Keystone Trio
Heart Beats (1995)
Newklear Music (1997)
With Jimmy Knepper
Cunningbird (SteepleChase, 1976)
I Dream Too Much (Soul Note, 1984)
Dream Dancing (Criss Cross, 1986)
With Steve Kuhn
Steve Kuhn Live in New York (Cobblestone, 1972)
With Andy LaVerne and Al Foster 
Time Well Spent (1994)
With John Lewis 
Evolution II (Atlantic, 2001)

With Joe Lovano
Grand Slam
Celebrating Sinatra (Blue Note, 1996)
I'm All For You (Blue Note, 2003)
Joyous Encounter (Blue Note, 2004)
Classic! Live at Newport (Blue Note, 2016)
With Warne Marsh
Star Highs (Criss Cross Jazz, 1982)
Posthumous (Interplay, 1985 [1987])
With Greg Marvin
The Greg Marvin Quartet (Hi Hat, Planet X, 1986)
I'll Get By (Planet X, 1987)
Workout! (Planet X, 1988)
Wake-up Call! (Planet X, 1996)
Special Edition (Planet X, 2001)

With Carmen McRae
Carmen Sings Monk (Bluebird, 1988)

With Charles Mingus
Three or Four Shades of Blues (Atlantic, 1977)
With Tete Montoliu
Body & Soul (Enja, 1971 [1983])
I Wanna Talk About You (SteepleChase, 1980)
The Man from Barcelona (Timeless, 1990)
With Mike Nock
In Out and Around (featuring Mike Brecker and Al Foster) (1979)

With Oscar Peterson
Another Day (MPS, 1970)
In Tune (MPS, 1971)
Walking the Line (MPS, 1971)

With Art Pepper 
Thursday Night at the Village Vanguard (Contemporary, 1977 [1979])
Friday Night at the Village Vanguard (Contemporary, 1977 [1979])
Saturday Night at the Village Vanguard (Contemporary, 1977 [1979])
More for Les at the Village Vanguard (Contemporary, 1977 [1985])
With Michel Petrucciani & Stephane Grappelli
Flamingo (Dreyfus, 1996)
With Quest
Quest (Trio/Palo Alto, 1981)
With Jimmy Raney
Wisteria (Criss Cross, 1985) with Tommy Flanagan
But Beautiful (Criss Cross, 1991) 
With John Scofield
John Scofield Live  (Enja, 1977)
With Zoot Sims
Zoot Sims and the Gershwin Brothers (Pablo, 1975)
Soprano Sax (Pablo, 1976)
If I'm Lucky (Pablo, 1977) with Jimmy Rowles
For Lady Day (Pablo, 1978 [1991])
Warm Tenor (Pablo, 1979) with Jimmy Rowles
The Sweetest Sounds (Pablo Today, 1979) with Rune Gustafsson

With The Thad Jones/Mel Lewis Orchestra
Suite for Pops (A&M, 1972)
Thad Jones/Mel Lewis and Manuel De Sica (Pausa, 1974)
Potpourri (Philadelphia International, 1974)
Live in Tokyo (Denon, 1974)
New Life (A&M, 1976)

With McCoy Tyner
McCoy Tyner Plays John Coltrane: Live at the Village Vanguard (Impulse!, 1997)
With Mal Waldron
Mal 81 (Progressive, 1981)
With Larry Willis
My Funny Valentine (Jazz City, 1988)

References

External links

Conversation With George Mraz, 6/01/2009

1944 births
2021 deaths
Berklee College of Music alumni
Czech jazz double-bassists
Male double-bassists
Czech jazz musicians
Jazz alto saxophonists
New York Jazz Quartet members
Milestone Records artists
People from Písek
21st-century American saxophonists
21st-century double-bassists
21st-century American male musicians
American male jazz musicians
The Thad Jones/Mel Lewis Orchestra members
Quest (band) members
20th-century saxophonists